Bruno Thibout (born 8 May 1969) is a French former professional racing cyclist. He rode in three editions of the Tour de France, three editions of the Vuelta a España and two editions of the Giro d'Italia. Having ridden for the Castorama, Motorola and Cofidis teams, in retirement he has worked as a motorbike rider for the ASO during the Tour de France.

References

External links
 

1969 births
Living people
French male cyclists
Sportspeople from Seine-Maritime
Cyclists from Normandy